Ángel Martínez Casado (Retuerto, León Province, Spain, 1947) is a Dominican friar and PhD in History and Theology.

Professional and Ecclesiastical Career
His doctoral thesis was supervised by Professor Julio Valdeón Baruque (as indicated by either Angel Martinez, on page 12 of your book), and later edited by San Esteban Editorial  as Lope de Barrientos.Un intellectual en la corte de Juan II. Since 1976 he has taught History of Philosophy in Greek and medieval in Higher Institute of Philosophy of Valladolid (since 1970, is integrated into the Pontifical University of Salamanca (UPSA) as Spanish Center for Advanced Studies and Ecclesiastical of Dominican), which is the current director. He was also professor at the Faculty of Theology of Valencia Catholic University Saint Vincent and since 1996 is being a professor of Church History in the Faculty of UPSA of Convent of St. Stephen and the Faculty of Theology of the Pontifical University of Salamanca. He also teaches specialized courses in Faculty of Philosophy of the Pontifical University of Salamanca . of the same university. He is Librarian of Convent of St. Stephen, and Technical Director of the Internet School of Theology "Santo Tomás de Aquino".

In 2008 he was appointed Corresponding Member of the Royal Academy of Doctors of Spain. Has also served as Vice Postulator of the Ecclesiastical Court in charge of the diocesan canonization of Mother Teresa Maria de Jesus Ortega Pardo, the former prioress of Olmedo Monastery, process which closed on July 18, 2006.

Bibliography

Books 

His books have been, among others in order of publication:

 1994, EDITORIAL SAN ESTEBAN, Title: Lope de Barrientos : Un Intellectual de la Corte de Juan II(Lope de Barrientos: An Intellectual Court Juan II), Salamanca, 
 2006, EDITORIAL SAN ESTEBAN, Title: Domingo de Soto: La causa de los pobres(Domingo de Soto: The cause of the poor), Salamanca,

Publishing Error Fe 

 2003, SAN ESTEBAN EDITORIAL Title:Peña de Francia: Historia, arte, entorno(Rock of France: History, art, environment), ISBN Although 84-8260-125-3 attributed to Angel Martínez Casado, actually wrote another Dominican of the same convent, Angel Perez Casado.

Articles en magazines 

 1976, Magazine Estudio Filosóficos, Valladolid`s Senior Institute of Philosophy, 182 pp: Title: Índices Generales 1951-1976 (General indexes 1951-1976). With collaboration of Juan Manuel ALMARZA. .
 1983, Magazine Archivos Leoneses: revista de estudios y documentación de los Reinos Hispano-Occidentales, Nº 74: pp. 263–312 (Leoneses Files: journal of studies and documentation of Hispano-Western Kingdoms), Title: Cátaros en León: testimonio de Lucas de Tuy (Cathars in Leon: Lucas of Tuy testimony); 
 1984, Magazine Estudio Filosóficos, Valladolid`s Senior Institute of Philosophy, Nº 33, pp. 59–84, Title: Aristotelismo hispánico en la primera mitad del siglo XII (Hispanic Aristotelianism in the first half of the twelfth century), pp. 353-359, Title: V centenario de Francisco de Vitoria (V centenary of Francisco de Vitoria), 
 1985, Magazine Estudio Filosóficos, Valladolid`s Senior Institute of Philosophy, Nº 34, pp. 545–548, Title: El pensamiento leonés en el siglo XII (Thought lions in the twelfth century), 
 1985, Magazine XX Siglos VI, Nº 24, pp. 41-50, Title: Evocación de Lope de Barrientos (Evocation of Lope de Barrientos), .
 1996, Magazine Archivo Dominicano, EDITORIAL SAN ESTEBAN, Nº 17: pp. 25-64, Title: La situación jurídica de los conversos según Lope de Barrientos (The legal status of converts as Lope de Barrientos), 
 1997, Magazine Estudio Filosóficos, Valladolid`s Senior Institute of Philosophy, Nº 44, pp. 7–38, Title: La filosofía áulica de Lope de Barrientos (The aulic philosophy of Lope de Barrientos), .
 1997, Magazine Ciencia Tomista, EDITORIAL SAN ESTEBAN, Vol. 124, pp. 159-177, Title: Disidencias manifestadas en León en la primera mitad del siglo XIII (Expressed dissent in Leon in the first half of the thirteenth century).  .
 1998, Magazine Studium Legionense, Nº 189, pp. 189–244, Title: La teología leonesa en la primera mitad del siglo XIII (Leon theology in the first half of the thirteenth century), .
 2002, Magazine Estudio Filosóficos, Valladolid`s Senior Institute of Philosophy, 240 pp: Title: Índices Generales 1977-2001, vol. 26-50 (General Index 1977-2001). .
 Magazine Cuadernos salmantinos de filosofía, Nº 30, 2003, pp. 629-646, Title: Los pobres y Domingo de Soto (The poor and Domingo de Soto). 
 2005, Magazine Imágenes de la FE, Sumario nº 397. November, Theology section, Title: La libertad del pensamiento. Una nueva filosofía para entender a Dios (Freedom of thought. A new philosophy to understand God), 
 2009, Magazine Ciencia Tomista, EDITORIAL SAN ESTEBAN, Tomo 136, Nº. 438, pp. 83-100, Title: El Magisterio de Domingo Báñez y su proyección en México (The Magisterium of Domingo Banez and its projection in Mexico). 
 2009, Magazine Estudio Filosóficos, Valladolid`s Senior Institute of Philosophy, Vol. 58, Nº 168, pp. 213–241, Title: La cuestión de la existencia de Dios en los iniciadores de la Escuela de Salamanca (The question of the existence of God in the initiators of the School of Salamanca),
 2010, Magazine Dominicana de Teología 6, pp. 27-43, Title: Las reivindicaciones de fray Bartolomé de la Casas (The claims of Fray Bartolomé de las Casas). .

Collaborations in Books 

 1983, EDITORIAL OPE, Caleruega, Nueve personajes históricos (Nine historical people). pp. 173–188, Title: San Pío V, papa y defensor de la fe (St. Pius V, Pope and defender of the faith), .
 1989, Biblioteca de Autores Cristianos (BAIC), Madrid, Santo TOMÁS DE AQUINO, Sum of Theology Parts I-II, issues 1-21. Translation of the text and technical references. .
 1991, Valladolid, In association with J. M. ALMARZA y J. LÓPEZ: Guía de Valladolid. Rutas históricas y monumentales por la provincia de Valladolid (Guide Valladolid. Monumental and historic routes through the province of Valladolid). 111 pp. .
 1994, Biblioteca de Autores Cristianos (BAIC), Madrid, Santo TOMÁS DE AQUINO, Sum of Theology Parts II-II (b), issues 80-140: technical references, pp. 20–390. 
 1994, Biblioteca de Autores Cristianos (BAIC), Madrid, Santo TOMÁS DE AQUINO, Sum of Theology Parts, vol. V: pp. 819–822: References to complete the text of the Sum of Theology .
 1997, Editores: Universidad de Valladolid y Secretariado de Publicaciones e Intercambio Editorial. Title: La filosofía española en Castilla y León: de los orígenes al Siglo de Oro, (Coordinador: Maximiliano Fartos Martínez ) (Spanish philosophy in Castilla y León: the origins of the Golden Age); three issues on pp. 71–78; Title: Herejes en Castilla y León en el siglo XIII (Heretics in Castile and León in the thirteenth century); pp. 79–86: Title: La escuela aristotélica de León en el siglo XIII (The Aristotelian school of Leon in the 13th century); pp. 87–96, Title: Lope de Barrientos. 
 2000, Coord: Juan Tomás Pastor García, Lorenzo Velázquez Campo and Maximiliano Fartos Martínez, La filosofía española en Castilla y León: de la Ilustración al siglo XX (Spanish philosophy in Castilla y León: the Enlightenment to the Twentieth Century), two collaborations on pp. 703–712, Title: Santiago Ramírez, and pp. 713–720, Title: Guillermo Fraile. 
 2001, Biblioteca de Autores Cristianos, Madrid,  TOMAS DE AQUINO SANTO. Opúsculos y cuestiones selectas, edición bilingüe, vol. I, pp.671-824, Title: "Las criaturas espirituales" (Spiritual Creatures), accommodation of the text, introduction, translation and notes. .
 2001, Edibesa, Madrid, Nuevo año cristiano, Abril, (Coordinador: J. A. MARTÍNEZ PUCHE) págs. 394-407; Title:San Pío V, Papa dominico (St. Pius V, Dominican pope) .
 2002, Aben Ezra Ediciones, Madrid, Edición crítica del Tractatus contra Madianitas et Ismaelitas adversarios et detractores fidelium qui de populo israelitico originem traxerunt. En (Coordinador: Carlos del Valle), págs. 119-239, Title:  El tratado contra madianitas e ismaelitas de Juan de Torquemada. Contra la discriminación conversa (The treaty against Midianites and Ishmaelites of Juan de Torquemada. Against Discrimination talks). .
 2003, Biblioteca de Autores Cristianos, Madrid, Tomas de Aquino Santo. Opúsculos y cuestiones selectas, edición bilingüe, vol. II, pp.293-384, Title: "Cuestión sobre el apetito del bien" (Question about the appetite of good). Edition, translation and notes, and pp. 619–676-384: Title: "Cuestión sobre el mal" (Question about evil). Translation and quotes, .
 2003, Editorial San Esteban, Salamanca, La ética, aliento de lo eterno" (Ethics, the eternal breath), (Coordinador: Luis Méndez Francisco),  pp. 173-188. Title: "Derechos de los pobres según Domingo de Soto (Rights of the poor as Domingo de Soto), 
 2005, Biblioteca de Autores Cristianos (BAIC), Madrid, Santo TOMÁS DE AQUINO, Sum of Teology, CD-ROM edition : Proofreading editing.
 2006, Coord: José Román Flecha Andrés, Miguel Anxo Pena González and Ángel Galindo García, Gozo y esperanza: memorial Prof. Dr. Julio A. Ramos Guerreira, pp. 485-500, Titl: El cielo y los sueños: explicación tradicional (Heaven and Dreams: traditional explanation), 
 2008, Biblioteca de Autores Cristianos, Madrid, ' TOMAS DE AQUINO SANTO. Opúsculos y cuestiones selectas, edición bilingüe, vol. V, pp.19-328., Title: "Compendio de Teología". Edition, translation and notes, and pp. 729–768, Title: "Tratado sobre las razones de la fe" (Treaty on the grounds of faith). Edition, translation and notes, .
 2008, Fundación Universitaria Española, Madrid,  La cultura española en la historia el barroco: ciclo promovido por la Real Academia de Doctores de España, con el patrocinio del Casino de Madrid, pp. 285–310; Title: Teología en el barroco. Controversias y devociones (Theology in the Baroque. Controversies and devotions), 
 2008, Fundación Universitaria Española, Madrid, La Cultura Española en la Historia. El Renacimiento: pp. 281-300; Title: "La Escuela de Salamanca, sus grandes maestros dominicos: Lectura actual de su doctrina (The School of Salamanca, the great masters Dominicans: Reading your current doctrine), .
 2009, Fundación Universitaria Española, Madrid,  La espiritualidad naturalista de fray Luis de Granada:la contemplación de Dios en la naturaleza en la Introducción del símbolo de la fe, by Julián de Cos Pérez de Camino, Thesis supervised by Professor UPSA (Pontifical Faculty of Theology San Esteban) Ángel Martínez Casado. Madrid  Y 
 2011, EDITORIAL SAN ESTEBAN, Salamanca, El grito y su eco.El sermón de Antón Montesino, with index of Ramón Hernández Martín, Gregorio Celada and Brian J. Pierce, and studies of Mauricio Beuchot, Francisco Javier Martínez Real and Jesús Espeja, work based on the transcripción del Sermón de Montesinos por el dominico leonés Prof. Ángel Martínez Casado, of the manuscripts of Fray Bartolomé de las Casas retaining the Spanish National Library. 

He managed the magazine Estudios Filosóficos since 1985 to 1990.

Conferences 
 2003 address summer course on the military orders, in which gave a lecture entitled 'The Templar Monk''' held at El Burgo de Osma, from 4 to 8 August. [www.cdlmadrid.org/cdl/htdocs/impresos/pdfs/burgodeosma.pdf], conducted in the summer courses of the University of Santa Catalina
 2nd Conference Seminar of Conmemoración del V Centenario''(V centenary commemoration), of the UAL, on claims that once made Fray Bartolome de las Casas, organized by the University of Almería, the Ministry of Education and Science and CSIC, also collaborate the Vice-Rector of Culture, University Extension, and Sports, the Vice-Rector of professor and Academic Planning, the Vice-Rector for Internationalization and Development Cooperation, and the Faculty of Humanities and Education Sciences at the University of Almería. The sessions are sponsored by Asempal and the Chamber of Commerce of Almería, IAE, and Spanish National Research Council(Section of Hispanic Studies School).

See also 

 Dominican Order
 Dominicans in Ireland
 Dominican Order in the United States

References

External links 
 Royal Academy of Doctors of Spain, the official website
 Official Website of the order
 Order of Preachers Homepage - Available in English, French and Spanish
 Official Website of Spain Dominican Family (In Spanish)
 Internet School of Theology "Santo Tomás de Aquino"
 Website of the San Esteban Editorial

Spanish Dominicans
Encomenderos
Spanish Roman Catholic priests
Spanish male writers
Roman Catholic writers
Living people
1947 births
Academic staff of the Pontifical University of Salamanca